Podvrh is a small settlement in the hills north of Poljane in the Municipality of Gorenja Vas–Poljane in the Upper Carniola region of Slovenia.

References

External links 

Podvrh on Geopedia

Populated places in the Municipality of Gorenja vas-Poljane